Saducismus triumphatus is a book on witchcraft by Joseph Glanvill, published posthumously in England in 1681.

The editor is presumed to have been Henry More, who certainly contributed to the volume; and topical material on witchcraft in Sweden was supplied by Anthony Horneck to later editions. By 1683 this appeared as a lengthy appendix. Horneck's contribution came from a Dutch pamphlet of 1670. Its composition is mentioned in the chapter on Transportation by an invisible power in the Miscellanies of John Aubrey.

The book affirmed the existence of witches with malign supernatural powers of magic, and attacked skepticism concerning their abilities.  Glanvill likened these skeptics to the Sadducees, members of a Jewish sect from around the time of Jesus who were said to have denied the immortality of the soul. The book is also noted for the account of the Drummer of Tedworth, an early poltergeist story, and for one of the earliest descriptions of the use of a witch bottle, a countercharm against witchcraft.

Influence

The book strongly influenced Cotton Mather in his Discourse on Witchcraft (1689) and the Salem witch trials held in 1692–3 in Salem, Massachusetts.  Mather's Wonders of the Invisible World (1693) is largely modeled after this book and its reports, particularly the material relating to the Mora witch trial of 1669. The book is cited by H. P. Lovecraft in his short story "The Festival". Shirley Jackson quoted passages from the book in her short story collection The Lottery and Other Stories.

In popular culture
It is possible to read the title painted on the walls of the secret passage in Dario Argento's 1977 film Suspiria at 01:29:19.

See also
Blockula
Malleus Maleficarum
Formicarius
 Domen, Norway 
 Brocken

Notes

External links
Graphical reproduction of Sadducismus Triumphatus at the University of Pennsylvania library.
Sadducismus Triumphatus at the Internet Archive.

1681 books
Witchcraft in England
Supernatural books
Witchcraft treatises